Kelly Brazier (born 28 October 1989) is a New Zealand rugby union player. She plays flyhalf, centre or fullback in New Zealand, Canterbury and Canadian club Edmonton Clansmen RFC.

Biography 
Brazier was born in Dunedin to an English father and an Irish mother who came to New Zealand with their first child Tony. Her sport career started at five when her two-years-older brother took her to a rugby field, and was split between touch in summer and rugby during winter. She was in New Zealand U21 mixed touch team at 14 and in New Zealand secondary schoolgirls team at 15. She also began to play in Alhambra Union rugby in 2003 and Otago Spirit provincial selection in 2004. She entered New Zealand rugby's record books on 2 May 2009, when she scored 64 points – ten tries and seven conversions – for her club in the Otago Metropolitan Women's Premier match against Kaikorai at the University Oval in Dunedin.

Brazier made her international debut against England on 14 November 2009 at Pillar Data Arena, in Esher, when Black Ferns won 16–3. In the second test match played at Twickenham in front of a record crowd of 12500 people Black Ferns was defeated 10–3. She took part in the 2010 Women's Rugby World Cup, playing a key role in the Black Ferns' success in the final against England and becoming the leading point scorer with 4 tries, 11 conversions and 2 penalties. She scored her first try during the match against South Africa thanks to a fine pass by Anna Richards.

After going to coach and play for Clan Rugby in Edmonton, Canada for four months, Brazier went back to New Zealand for the start of Women's NPC with Canterbury. In spite of a good debut with her new team – two tries in a 60–0 win over Hawke's Bay Tuis – and some other victories against Manawatu Cyclones and her former team Otago Spirit, Canterbury failed to reach the final.

In October 2011, she was called by New Zealand head coach Grant Hansen to play three tests against England, a tour which concluded with two losses and a draw for Black Ferns and only 5 points for her (a conversion and a penalty).

Brazier was among the nominees for the 2009 Steinlager Rugby Awards for NZRU Women's Player of the Year with Carla Hohepa and Victoria Heighway, who won. Brazier was also named the Otago Institute of Sport and Adventure's top sportsperson in 2009 and 2010. She was named in the squad for the 2017 Women's Rugby World Cup.

At the 2018 Commonwealth Games, Brazier was scored the winning try in the grand final against Australia, running 80 metres and securing gold for New Zealand.  In 2019, she was part of the winning team of the Women's Super Rugby Series.

She is openly lesbian and her wife Tahlia gave birth to their first child in 2020.

Brazier was named in the Black Ferns Sevens squad for the 2022 Commonwealth Games in Birmingham. She won a bronze medal at the Commonwealth Games. She later won a silver medal in her third Rugby World Cup Sevens in Cape Town.

References

External links
 Black Ferns profile
 
 
 
 

1989 births
Living people
New Zealand people of English descent
New Zealand people of Irish descent
New Zealand female rugby union players
New Zealand women's international rugby union players
New Zealand women's international rugby sevens players
New Zealand female rugby sevens players
Otago rugby union players
Canterbury rugby union players
People educated at Otago Girls' High School
Otago Polytechnic alumni
Rugby sevens players at the 2016 Summer Olympics
Olympic rugby sevens players of New Zealand
Olympic silver medalists for New Zealand
Olympic medalists in rugby sevens
Medalists at the 2016 Summer Olympics
Rugby union players from Dunedin
Rugby sevens players at the 2018 Commonwealth Games
Commonwealth Games rugby sevens players of New Zealand
Commonwealth Games gold medallists for New Zealand
Commonwealth Games medallists in rugby sevens
Rugby sevens players at the 2020 Summer Olympics
Medalists at the 2020 Summer Olympics
Olympic gold medalists for New Zealand
New Zealand LGBT sportspeople
New Zealand lesbians
LGBT rugby union players
Lesbian sportswomen
Rugby sevens players at the 2022 Commonwealth Games
Medallists at the 2018 Commonwealth Games
Medallists at the 2022 Commonwealth Games